Version 2.0: The Official Remixes is a remix album by American alternative rock group Garbage. It was released on July 6, 2018 on their own label Stunvolume. The album is made up of sixteen remixes and alternate versions from Garbage's second studio album Version 2.0 and was made available to all digital stores and streaming services. The bundle complements the band's 20th Anniversary re-issue of the Version 2.0 album, and were chosen by the band to bring a new perspective to the album.

Background
The compilations pulls together remixes by Boom Boom Satellites, the Crystal Method, Purity, Rickidy Raw, Eric Kupper and Fun Lovin' Criminals that were originally released on the Version 2.0 CD singles distributed outside of North America, as well as dub versions taken from 12" vinyl promo releases given their first commercial release here. The full length 12" remix of "Special" by Brothers in Rhythm and club mix of "When I Grow Up" by Danny Tenaglia are also presented here commercially for the first time; the original CD singles contained edited versions of these remixes. Two pop radio remixes of these songs also appear, both slightly differing from their original airplay releases (There is no second drop out on the bridge on "Special"; there is a slightly-extended outro with an extra lyric on the pop mix of "When I Grow Up"). These were both rearranged by Garbage themselves for North American airplay (alongside a second, more laid back rework of "Special" by Rickidy Raw) and are presented commercially for the first time, as well as for the first time outside of that territory.

Track listing

Release history

References

External links
Garbage official website

2018 remix albums
Garbage (band) remix albums
Electronic remix albums
Almo Sounds albums
Interscope Records remix albums